Bad Kösen was a Verwaltungsgemeinschaft ("collective municipality") in the Burgenlandkreis (district), in Saxony-Anhalt, Germany. The seat of the Verwaltungsgemeinschaft was in Bad Kösen. It was disbanded in January 2008.

The Verwaltungsgemeinschaft Bad Kösen consisted of the following municipalities:

 Abtlöbnitz 
 Bad Kösen
 Crölpa-Löbschütz 
 Janisroda 
 Leislau 
 Prießnitz

Bad Kösen
Former Verwaltungsgemeinschaften in Saxony-Anhalt